The Manipur Legislative Assembly  is the unicameral legislature of the Indian state of Manipur.

See also
Vidhan Sabha
List of districts of Manipur
State governments of India
List of constituencies of the Manipur Legislative Assembly

References

Manipur Lok Sabha Election 2019 Results Website

 
State legislatures of India
Unicameral legislatures